Ashford railway station serves the town of Ashford, Surrey, in the borough of Spelthorne in South East England.

Although the station signage displays only Ashford, the station is referred to in timetables, and as printed on railway tickets, either as Ashford (Surrey), or Ashford (Middlesex) (from the historic county),  in order to differentiate it from Ashford International railway station in Kent.

History

The station was opened in 1848 by the Windsor Staines and South Western Railway Company. Absorbed by the London and South Western Railway, it became part of the Southern Railway  during the grouping of 1923. The station then passed on to the Southern Region of British Railways on nationalisation in 1948.

When sectorisation was introduced in the 1980s, the station was served by Network SouthEast
until the privatisation of British Railways.

The station also previously had a goods yard to the north of the station and is now a aggregates yard.

Services

The station is owned by Network Rail and managed by South Western Railway, who provide all train services from the station. The station is between Staines and Feltham on the line from Waterloo to Windsor.

The typical off-peak service from the station is:

4tph (trains per hour) to London Waterloo
2tph to Windsor and Eton Riverside
2tph to Weybridge

Gallery

References

 Station on navigable 1946 O. S. map

External links

Railway stations in Surrey
DfT Category C2 stations 
Former London and South Western Railway stations
Railway stations in Great Britain opened in 1848
Railway stations served by South Western Railway
Ashford, Surrey